Portrait of Eleonora Gonzaga is a 1538 painting by Titian, now in the Uffizi in Florence alongside its pair, Portrait of Francesco Maria della Rovere, showing Eleonora's husband. It formed the prototype for some of his later portraits, such as that of  Isabella of Portugal.

References

Eleonora Gonzaga
1538 paintings
Paintings in the collection of the Uffizi